Non-Stop Rock is the first studio album by the American glam metal band London, released in 1985 by Shrapnel Records.

The riff during the intro to the song "Radio Stars" is taken from the song "Too Fast for Love" by Mötley Crüe.

The album is slated for reissue in 2017.

Track listing 
Side one
 "Dirty City" (Lizzie Grey, Nadir D'Priest, Brian West) - 2:39
 "Non-Stop Rock" (Grey, D'Priest, Bobby Marks) - 3:39
 "Werewolves in London" (Grey, D'Priest) - 4:36
 "It's Rock & Roll" (Grey) - 3:59 
 "Stand Back" (Grey, Marks, D'Priest, West) - 2:37

Side two
 "No Tell Motel" (Grey, West, D'Priest) - 3:13
 "Party in Hollywood" (Grey, D'Priest) - 3:00
 "Masters of the Airwaves" (Grey, D'Priest) - 4:00
 "Radio Stars" (Grey) - 3:31

Personnel

Band members
 Nadir D'Priest - vocals
 Lizzie Grey - guitars
 Brian West - bass
 Bobby Marks - drums

Additional Musicians 
 Peter Szucs - keyboards on track 3
 Fred Coury - drums (on LP sleeve but did not play on the album)

Production
Bret Newman - engineer, mixing on tracks 2, 3, 5, 7
Steve Fontano - mixing

References 

1985 debut albums
Shrapnel Records albums
London (heavy metal band) albums
Albums recorded at Sound City Studios